Nova Sport is a secondary subscription sports channel, which started broadcasting on December 4, 2019 as a member of The United Group, currently the leading media platform in Southeast Europe, including the Sport Klub and Nova TV networks.

Nova Sport is United Media's main channel for broadcasting the German Bundesliga as well as a large number of NFL championship matches. Also, the Nova Sport channel shows football matches from less attractive leagues such as the Finnish Veikkausliiga, the Czech First League, the Slovenian PrvaLiga, the Lithuanian A Lyga and the Belarusian Premier League. Other sports include the Masters 1000 and ATP 500 tennis tournaments as well as Wimbledon and NASCAR championship races.

Coverage area 
The Nova Sport program can be watched through SBB and TotalTV in Serbia, Croatia, Montenegro and Bosnia and Herzegovina.

Broadcasting rights

References 

Sports television networks
Sports television in Serbia
Television channels and stations established in 2019